Food of Love is a 1997 film directed by Stephen Poliakoff. It stars Richard E. Grant and Nathalie Baye.

Cast
Richard E. Grant as Alex Salmon
Nathalie Baye as Michele
Joe McGann as Sam
Sylvia Syms as Mrs. Harvey-Brown
Juliet Aubrey as Madeline

References

External links

1997 films
Films directed by Stephen Poliakoff
British romantic comedy films
1997 romantic comedy films
1990s English-language films
1990s British films